Comana may refer to:

 Comana (Cappadocia), an ancient city in Turkey
 Comana Pontica, an ancient city of Pontus in Turkey
 Comăna, a commune in Brașov County, Romania (including the villages of Comăna de Jos and Comăna de Sus)
 Comana, Constanța, a commune in Constanţa County, Romania
 Comana, Giurgiu, a commune in Giurgiu County, Romania
 Comana, a tributary of the Ialomița in Ialomița County, Romania
 Comana (Olt), a tributary of the Olt in Brașov County, Romania

Other 
 Comana (genus), a moth genus in the family Limacodidae

See also 
 Commana
 Coman (disambiguation)
 Comanca (disambiguation)
 Comănești (disambiguation)
 Komana, a village in the North-West District of Botswana